Didier Knayer (born 26 November 1957) is a French former professional footballer who played as a centre-back. In his career, he played for INF Vichy, Bastia, Béziers, Orléans, and Martigues.

Club career 
After starting his career at INF Vichy, Knayer joined Bastia following a recommendation by Pierre Pibarot. Knayer participated in Bastia's run in the 1977–78 UEFA Cup; he played during the club's 3–1 victory over Newcastle United in the second round. He made eight Division 1 appearances during his stay at the Corsican club. In 1979, Knoyer joined Béziers. Ahead of the 1983–84 season, he was recruited by Orléans. In 1986, Knoyer signed for Martigues. He ended his professional career three years later in 1989.

International career 
Knayer was a France youth international.

Personal life 
Didier's father  was also a footballer.

After his football career, Knayer became a real estate developer in Santa-Maria-di-Lota.

Honours 
Bastia

 UEFA Cup runner-up: 1977–78

Notes

References 

1957 births
Living people
Footballers from Toulouse
French footballers
Association football central defenders
INF Vichy players
SC Bastia players
AS Béziers Hérault (football) players
US Orléans players
FC Martigues players
French Division 3 (1971–1993) players
Ligue 1 players
Ligue 2 players